Dobkowice may refer to the following places in Poland:
Dobkowice, Lower Silesian Voivodeship (south-west Poland)
Dobkowice, Subcarpathian Voivodeship (south-east Poland)